Kijitonyama is an administrative ward in the Kinondoni district of the Dar es Salaam Region of Tanzania. In 2016 the Tanzania National Bureau of Statistics report there were 72,795 people in the ward, from 58,132 in 2012.

References

Kinondoni District
Wards of Dar es Salaam Region